Maureen Mollie Hunter McIlwraith (30 June 1922 – 31 July 2012) was a Scottish writer known as Mollie Hunter. She wrote fantasy for children, historical stories for young adults, and realistic novels for adults. Many of her works are inspired by Scottish history, or by Scottish or Irish folklore, with elements of magic and fantasy.

Life
Born and raised near Edinburgh in the small village of Longniddry, her final years were spent in Inverness. A portrait of her hangs in the Scottish National Portrait Gallery.

Hunter's debut was Patrick Kentigern Keenan, published by Blackie and Son in 1963 with illustrations by Charles Keeping. In the U.S. it was published in 1963 as The Smartest Man in Ireland.

Awards
For  The Stronghold Mollie Hunter won the 1974 Carnegie Medal from the Library Association, recognising the year's best children's book by a British subject. The same novel, published in The Netherlands as "Een toren tegen de romeinen" won the "Zilveren Griffel" (Silver Pen) award in 1978 for children's writing.

She won the Phoenix Award from the Children's Literature Association in 1992, recognising A Sound of Chariots (1972) as the best children's book published twenty years earlier that did not win a major award.

The Oxford English Dictionary credits Hunter with a quotation regarding the word consensus: "No single group has the right to ignore a consensus of thoughtful opinion"

Works

Novels
 Patrick Kentigern Keenan (1963)
 US title, The Smartest Man in Ireland
The Spanish Letters (1964)
 The Kelpie's Pearls (1964)
A Pistol in Greenyards (1965)
The Ghosts of Glencoe (1966)
Thomas and the Warlock (1967)
 The Ferlie (1968); also issued as The Enchanted Whistle (1985)
 The Bodach (1970)
 US title, The Walking Stones
The Third Resistance (1971)
The Lothian Run (1971)
 The Thirteenth Member (1971)
 The Haunted Mountain (1972)
 A Sound of Chariots (Harper & Row, 1972)
 The Stronghold (Hamilton, 1974)
 A Stranger Came Ashore (Hamilton, 1975)
 The Wicked One (1977)
 The Third Eye (1979)
 You Never Knew Her as I Did! (1981)
The Dragonfly Years (1983)
 US title, Hold on to Love
The Knight of the Golden Plain (1983)
I'll Go My Own Way (1985)
 US title Cat, Herself
Escape from Loch Leven (1987)
 The Mermaid Summer (1988)
The MidSummer Murders (1988)
 The King's Swift Rider: A Novel on Robert the Bruce (1998)

Collections
 A Furl of Fairy Wind (1977)

Plays
Stay for an Answer (1962)
The Captain
A Love-song for My Lady
The Walking Stones

Picture books

Hi Johnny (1963)
The Brownie (1986), illus. Mahri Christopherson
The Enchanted Boy (1986), illus. Christopherson
Flora MacDonald and Bonnie Prince Charlie (1988), illus. Chris Molan
 Gilly Martin the Fox (1994), illus. Dennis McDermott

Nonfiction
 Talent Is Not Enough: Mollie Hunter on Writing for Children (1976)
 The Pied Piper Syndrome and Other Essays (1992)

Notes

References

External links
 
 
 

1922 births
2012 deaths
Scottish children's writers
Scottish women novelists
Carnegie Medal in Literature winners
People from East Lothian
20th-century Scottish novelists
21st-century Scottish novelists
21st-century Scottish writers
20th-century Scottish women writers
21st-century Scottish women writers
Swiss women children's writers
20th-century Scottish dramatists and playwrights
21st-century Scottish dramatists and playwrights
Scottish women dramatists and playwrights
Women writers of young adult literature
Women historical novelists
Scottish historical novelists
British writers of young adult literature
Writers of historical fiction set in antiquity